Nāvbed was the title of the commander of the Sasanian navy.

Sources 
 

Sasanian military offices
Sasanian navy
Admirals